Warbeat is a 1989 new beat song by the Belgian electronic music group and new beat band Bassline Boys. It was their only hit. The song was, however, controversial for sampling the voice of Adolf Hitler.

History

In 1989 the Bassline Boys released their first single, Warbeat. The dance single takes World War II as a thematic concept and samples radio speeches by various well-known politicians during the conflict, including Winston Churchill, an unknown French radio announcer, Adolf Hitler and Dwight D. Eisenhower. The song's refrain (Adolf, you're going to pay) emphasizes that the track isn't intended as a pro-Nazi song, but quite the opposite. Nevertheless, quite some listeners misinterpreted Warbeat as a Neo Nazi music. Since the Bassline Boys didn't tour, various dance acts in clubs pretended to be them. Some even dressed up in Nazi uniforms and made the Nazi salute on stage. The controversy was enough to be the subject of an episode of the talkshow Ciel, Mon Mardi, hosted by Christophe Dechavanne. Some of the costumed club dancers were invited to the studio, where they denied any allegations of Nazism. The real Bassline Boys weren't invited. When they asked the show's producers for a right to reply, this was denied. In a direct reaction, the band recorded another single, On Se Calme, in which they mocked the controversy by sampling Dechavanne's voice.

Sources

External links
 Discogs page.

Belgian new beat songs
Belgian electronic songs
Belgian pop songs
Novelty songs
Comedy songs
1989 songs
1989 singles
French-language Belgian songs
German-language Belgian songs
English-language Belgian songs
Songs about World War II
Songs about politicians
Songs about Adolf Hitler
Cultural depictions of Winston Churchill
Cultural depictions of Adolf Hitler
Cultural depictions of Dwight D. Eisenhower
Songs about Germany
Songs based on speech samples
Sampling controversies
Race-related controversies in music